Lomonosovite is a phosphate–silicate mineral with the idealized formula Na10Ti4(Si2O7)2(PO4)2O4  early Na5Ti2(Si2O7)(PO4)O2 or Na2Ti2Si2O9*Na3PO4.

The main admixtures are niobium (up to 11.8% Nb2O5), manganese (up to 4.5 %MnO) and iron (up to 2.8%).

Discovery and name 
The mineral was discovered by V.I. Gerasimovskii  in Lovozersky agpaitic massif. Named for Mikhail Lomonosov - famous Russian poet, chemist and philosopher, but the earlier - mining engineer.

Crystal structure 
According to X-ray data, lomonosovite structure was determined is triclinic unit cell with parameters: a = 5.44 Å, b = 7.163 Å, c = 14.83 Å, α = 99°, β = 106°, and γ = 90°, usually centrosymmetric (sp. gr. P-1), but acentric varieties (polytype) are also reported.

The crystal structure of lomonosovite is based on three-layer HOH packets consisting of a central octahedral O layer and two outer heteropolyhedral H layers. Ti- and Na centered octahedra are distinguished in the O layer, whereas the H layers are composed of Ti-centered octahedra and Si2O7 diorthogroups, (like in other heterophyllosilicates, for example lamprophyllite). The interpacket space includes Na+ cations and PO43- anions.

Properties 
Lomonosovite forms lamellar and tabular crystals with perfect cleavage. It is macroscopically brown, from cinnamon-brown to black. It is transparent in thin plates. The luster vitreous to adamantine.

Its pleochroism is strong from colorless to brown. The refractive index is = 1.654-1.670  = 1.736 - 1.750  =1.764-1.778  2V=56-69.

Hardness 3-4 Density 3.12 - 3.15.

Origin 
Accessory mineral of peralkaline agpaitic nepheline syenites (like Khibina and Lovozero massif, Russia, Ilimaussaq intrusion, Greenland) important mineral of agpaitic pegmatites and peralkaline fenites.

References 

Crystals
Phosphate minerals
Silicate minerals